Qasim Basir is an American filmmaker. He wrote and directed Mooz-lum (2011) starring Danny Glover and Nia Long about an African-American Muslim family and how their lives are changed by the September 11 attacks. The film received nominations from the NAACP Image Awards and Black Reel Awards.

Basir also wrote and directed Destined (2016) starring Cory Hardrict. Basir won Best Director at the American Black Film Festival.

Basir's film A Boy, A Girl, A Dream starring Omari Hardwick and Meagan Good has been selected for the  2018 Sundance Film Festival.

References

Year of birth missing (living people)
Living people
American filmmakers
African-American Muslims
African-American film directors